Season 1893–94 was the first season in which Dundee competed at a Scottish national level, playing in Division One for the first time. Throughout the season, Dundee would alternate between the two kits of their merger clubs, Dundee East End (sky blue stripes) and Dundee Our Boys (all navy blue). Dundee would play the first half of their debut season at Our Boys' former ground, West Craigie Park, before moving to Carolina Port for the second half in 1894.

Scottish Division One

Statistics provided by Dee Archive

League table

Player Statistics 
Only showing players with confirmed appearances

|}

See also
List of Dundee F.C. seasons

References

External links

Dundee F.C. seasons
Dundee